E251 is a European B class road in Germany, connecting the cities Sassnitz – Stralsund – Neubrandenburg – Berlin

Sassnitz, Stralsund, Neubrandenburg, Berlin

External links 
 UN Economic Commission for Europe: Overall Map of E-road Network (2007)

251